Lindsay Frelink (born 6 August 1999) is a Dutch wheelchair basketball player (2.0 disability class) and a member of the Netherlands women's national wheelchair basketball team. She won the gold medal at the 2020 Summer Paralympics, with the national team.

Life 
Frelink was born with spina bifida. Frelink studied graphic design at Mediacollege Amsterdam. She lives in Heerhugowaard.

Frelink started with wheelchair basketball when she was 12 years old. She made her debut for the national team in 2017 and won in that year the gold medal at the European Championships in Tenerife.

She competed at the 2018 World Championship, and 2017 and 2019 European championships .

References

1999 births
Living people
Dutch women's wheelchair basketball players
Place of birth missing (living people)
Paralympic wheelchair basketball players of the Netherlands
Wheelchair basketball players at the 2020 Summer Paralympics
Medalists at the 2020 Summer Paralympics
Paralympic medalists in wheelchair basketball
Paralympic gold medalists for the Netherlands
21st-century Dutch women